The 2005 FIBA Americas Championship for Women, was the eight FIBA Americas Championship for Women regional basketball championship held by FIBA Americas, which also served as Americas qualifier for the 2006 FIBA World Championship for Women, granting berths to the top four teams in the final standings. It was held in Dominican Republic between 14 and 18 August 1997. Eight national teams entered the event under the auspices of FIBA Americas, the sport's regional governing body. The city of São Paulo hosted the tournament. Cuba won their third title after defeating the Brazil in the final.

Squads

Group round

Standings

|}

External links
2005 Panamerican Olympic Qualifying Tournament for Women, FIBA.com.

FIBA Women's AmeriCup
2005 in women's basketball
2005–06 in North American basketball
2005–06 in South American basketball
Basketball in the Dominican Republic
International basketball competitions hosted by the Dominican Republic
2005 in Dominican Republic women's sport